

Events

Pre-1600
 622 – The beginning of the Islamic calendar.
 997 – Battle of Spercheios: Bulgarian forces of Tsar Samuel are defeated by a Byzantine army under general Nikephoros Ouranos at the Spercheios River in Greece.
1054 – Three Roman legates break relations between Western and Eastern Christian Churches through the act of placing a Papal bull (of doubtful validity) of Excommunication on the altar of Hagia Sophia during Saturday afternoon divine liturgy. Historians frequently describe the event as the formal start of the East–West Schism.
1212 – Battle of Las Navas de Tolosa: After Pope Innocent III calls European knights to a crusade, forces of Kings Alfonso VIII of Castile, Sancho VII of Navarre, Peter II of Aragon and Afonso II of Portugal defeat those of the Berber Muslim leader Almohad, thus marking a significant turning point in the Reconquista and in the medieval history of Spain.
1228 – The canonization of Saint Francis of Assisi
1232 – The Spanish town of Arjona declares independence and names its native Muhammad ibn Yusuf as ruler. This marks the Muhammad's first rise to prominence; he would later establish the Nasrid Emirate of Granada, the last independent Muslim state in Spain.
1251 – Celebrated by the Carmelite Order–but doubted by modern historians–as the day when Saint Simon Stock had a vision of the Virgin Mary.
1377 – King Richard II of England is crowned.
1536 – Jacques Cartier, navigator and explorer, returns home to St. Malo after claiming Stadacona (Quebec), Hochelaga (Montereal) and the River of Canada (St. Lawrence River) region for France.

1601–1900
1661 – The first banknotes in Europe are issued by the Swedish bank Stockholms Banco.
1683 – Manchu Qing dynasty naval forces under traitorous commander Shi Lang defeat the Kingdom of Tungning in the Battle of Penghu near the Pescadores Islands.
1769 – Father Junípero Serra founds California's first mission, Mission San Diego de Alcalá. Over the following decades, it evolves into the city of San Diego, California.
1779 – American Revolutionary War: Light infantry of the Continental Army seize a fortified British Army position in a midnight bayonet attack at the Battle of Stony Point.
1790 – The District of Columbia is established as the capital of the United States after signature of the Residence Act.
1809 – The city of La Paz, in what is today Bolivia, declares its independence from the Spanish Crown during the La Paz revolution and forms the Junta Tuitiva, the first independent government in Spanish America, led by Pedro Domingo Murillo.
1849 – Antonio María Claret y Clará founds the Congregation of the Missionary Sons of the Immaculate Heart of Mary, popularly known as the Claretians in Vic, in the province of Barcelona, Catalonia, Spain.
1858 – The last apparition of the Blessed Virgin Mary to Bernadette Soubirous in Lourdes, France.
1861 – American Civil War: At the order of President Abraham Lincoln, Union troops begin a 25-mile march into Virginia for what will become the First Battle of Bull Run, the first major land battle of the war.
1862 – American Civil War: David Farragut is promoted to rear admiral, becoming the first officer in United States Navy to hold an admiral rank.

1901–present
1909 – Persian Constitutional Revolution: Mohammad Ali Shah Qajar is forced out as Shah of Persia and is replaced by his son Ahmad Shah Qajar.
1910 – John Robertson Duigan makes the first flight of the Duigan pusher biplane, the first aircraft built in Australia.
1915 – Henry James becomes a British citizen to highlight his commitment to Britain during the first World War.
  1915   – At Treasure Island on the Delaware River in the United States, the First Order of the Arrow ceremony takes place and the Order of the Arrow is founded to honor American Boy Scouts who best exemplify the Scout Oath and Law.
1927 – Augusto César Sandino leads a raid on U.S. Marines and Nicaraguan Guardia Nacional that had been sent to apprehend him in the village of Ocotal, but is repulsed by one of the first dive-bombing attacks in history.
1931 – Emperor Haile Selassie signs the first constitution of Ethiopia.
1935 – The world's first parking meter is installed in Oklahoma City, Oklahoma.
1941 – Joe DiMaggio hits safely for the 56th consecutive game, a streak that still stands as an MLB record.
1942 – Holocaust: Vel' d'Hiv Roundup (Rafle du Vel' d'Hiv): The government of Vichy France orders the mass arrest of 13,152 Jews who are held at the Vélodrome d'Hiver in Paris before deportation to Auschwitz.
1945 – Manhattan Project: The Atomic Age begins when the United States successfully detonates a plutonium-based test nuclear weapon near Alamogordo, New Mexico.
  1945   – World War II: The heavy cruiser  leaves San Francisco with parts for the atomic bomb "Little Boy" bound for Tinian Island.
1948 – Following token resistance, the city of Nazareth, revered by Christians as the hometown of Jesus, capitulates to Israeli troops during Operation Dekel in the 1948 Arab–Israeli War.
  1948   – The storming of the cockpit of the Miss Macao passenger seaplane, operated by a subsidiary of the Cathay Pacific Airways, marks the first aircraft hijacking of a commercial plane.
1950 – Chaplain–Medic massacre: American POWs are massacred by North Korean Army.
1951 – King Leopold III of Belgium abdicates in favor of his son, Baudouin I of Belgium.
  1951   – J. D. Salinger publishes his popular yet controversial novel, The Catcher in the Rye.
1956 – Ringling Bros. and Barnum & Bailey Circus closes its last "Big Tent" show in Pittsburgh, Pennsylvania; due to changing economics, all subsequent circus shows will be held in arenas.
1957 – KLM Flight 844 crashes off the Schouten Islands in present day Indonesia (then Netherlands New Guinea), killing 58 people.
1965 – The Mont Blanc Tunnel linking France and Italy opens.
  1965   – South Vietnamese Colonel Phạm Ngọc Thảo, a formerly undetected communist spy and double agent, is hunted down and killed by unknown individuals after being sentenced to death in absentia for a February 1965 coup attempt against Nguyễn Khánh.
1969 – Apollo program: Apollo 11, the first mission to land astronauts on the Moon, is launched from the Kennedy Space Center at Cape Kennedy, Florida.
1979 – Iraqi President Ahmed Hassan al-Bakr resigns and is replaced by Saddam Hussein.
1983 – Sikorsky S-61 disaster: A helicopter crashes off the Isles of Scilly, causing 20 fatalities.
1990 – The Luzon earthquake strikes the Philippines with an intensity of 7.7, affecting Benguet, Pangasinan, Nueva Ecija, La Union, Aurora, Bataan, Zambales and Tarlac.
  1990   – The Parliament of the Ukrainian SSR declares state sovereignty over the territory of the Ukrainian SSR.
1994 – The comet Shoemaker-Levy 9 is destroyed in a head-on collision with Jupiter.
1999 – John F. Kennedy Jr., his wife, Carolyn Bessette-Kennedy, and her sister, Lauren Bessette, die when the aircraft he is piloting crashes into the Atlantic Ocean off the coast of Martha's Vineyard.
2004 – Millennium Park, considered Chicago's first and most ambitious early 21st-century architectural project, is opened to the public by Mayor Richard M. Daley.
2005 – An Antonov An-24 crashes near Baney in Bioko Norte, Equatorial Guinea, killing 60 people.
2007 – An earthquake of magnitude 6.8 and 6.6 aftershock occurs off the Niigata coast of Japan killing eight people, injuring at least 800 and damaging a nuclear power plant.
2009 – Teoh Beng Hock, an aide to a politician in Malaysia is found dead on the rooftop of a building adjacent to the offices of the Anti-Corruption Commission, sparking an inquest that gains nationwide attention.
2013 – As many as 27 children die and 25 others are hospitalized after eating lunch served at their school in eastern India.
  2013   – Syrian civil war: The Battle of Ras al-Ayn resumes between the People's Protection Units (YPG) and Islamist forces, beginning the Rojava–Islamist conflict.
2015 – Four U.S. Marines and one gunman die in a shooting spree targeting military installations in Chattanooga, Tennessee.
2019 – A 100-year-old building in Mumbai, India, collapses, killing at least 10 people and leaving many others trapped.

Births

Pre-1600
1194 – Clare of Assisi, Italian nun and saint (d. 1253)
1486 – Andrea del Sarto, Italian painter (d. 1530)
1517 – Frances Grey, Duchess of Suffolk, English duchess (d. 1559)
1529 – Petrus Peckius the Elder, Dutch jurist, writer on international maritime law (d. 1589)

1601–1900
1611 – Cecilia Renata of Austria (d. 1644)
1661 – Pierre Le Moyne d'Iberville, Canadian captain, explorer, and politician (d. 1706)
1714 – Marc René, marquis de Montalembert, French engineer and author (d. 1800)
1722 – Joseph Wilton, English sculptor and academic (d. 1803)
1723 – Joshua Reynolds, English painter and academic (d. 1792)
1731 – Samuel Huntington, American jurist and politician, 18th Governor of Connecticut (d. 1796)
1749 – Cyrus Griffin, American lawyer, judge, and politician, 16th President of the Continental Congress (d. 1810)
1796 – Jean-Baptiste-Camille Corot, French painter and etcher (d. 1875)
1821 – Mary Baker Eddy, American religious leader and author, founded Christian Science (d. 1910)
1841 – Nikolai von Glehn, Estonian-German architect and activist (d. 1923)
1858 – Eugène Ysaÿe, Belgian violinist, composer, and conductor (d. 1931)
1862 – Ida B. Wells, American journalist and activist (d. 1931)
1863 – Anderson Dawson, Australian politician, 14th Premier of Queensland (d. 1910)
1870 – Lambert McKenna, Irish priest, lexicographer, and scholar (d. 1956)
1871 – John Maxwell, American golfer (d. 1906)
1872 – Roald Amundsen, Norwegian pilot and explorer (d. 1928)
  1872   – Frank Cooper, Australian politician, 25th Premier of Queensland (d. 1949)
1880 – Kathleen Norris, American journalist and author (d. 1966)
1882 – Violette Neatley Anderson, American judge (d. 1937)
1883 – Charles Sheeler, American photographer and painter (d. 1965)
1884 – Anna Vyrubova, Russian author (d. 1964)
1887 – Shoeless Joe Jackson, American baseball player and manager (d. 1951)
1888 – Percy Kilbride, American actor (d. 1964)
  1888   – Frits Zernike, Dutch physicist and academic, Nobel Prize laureate (d. 1966)
1889 – Arthur Bowie Chrisman, American author (d. 1953)
1895 – Wilfrid Hamel, Canadian businessman and politician, 35th Mayor of Quebec City (d. 1968)
1896 – Otmar Freiherr von Verschuer, German biologist and eugenicist (d. 1969)
  1896   – Trygve Lie, Norwegian trade union leader and politician, 1st Secretary-General of the United Nations (d. 1968)
1898 – Lady Eve Balfour, British farmer, educator, and founding figure in the organic movement (d. 1990)

1901–present
1902 – Alexander Luria, Russian psychologist and physician (d. 1977)
  1902   – Mary Philbin, American actress (d. 1993)
1903 – Fritz Bauer, German lawyer and judge (d. 1968)
  1903   – Carmen Lombardo, Canadian singer-songwriter (d. 1971)
  1903   – Irmgard Flügge-Lotz, German mathematician and engineer (d. 1974)
1904 – Goffredo Petrassi, Italian composer and conductor (d. 2003)
1906 – Vincent Sherman, American actor, director, and screenwriter (d. 2006)
1907 – Frances Horwich, American educator and television host (d. 2001)
  1907   – Orville Redenbacher, American farmer and businessman, founded Orville Redenbacher's (d. 1995)
  1907   – Barbara Stanwyck, American actress (d. 1990)
1910 – Stan McCabe, Australian cricketer (d. 1968)
  1910   – Gordon Prange, American historian, author, and academic (d. 1980)
1911 – Ginger Rogers, American actress, singer, and dancer (d. 1995)
  1911   – Sonny Tufts, American actor (d. 1970)
1912 – Milt Bocek, American baseball player (d. 2007)
  1912   – Amy Patterson, Argentine composer, singer, poet, and teacher (d. 2019) 
1915 – Barnard Hughes, American actor (d. 2006)
  1915   – Elaine Barrie, American actress (d. 2003)
1918 – Denis Edward Arnold, English soldier (d. 2015)
  1918   – Paul Farnes, British Royal Air Force (RAF) fighter pilot (d. 2020)
  1918   – Samuel Victor Perry, English biochemist and rugby player (d. 2009)
1919 – Hermine Braunsteiner, Austrian SS officer (d. 1999)
  1919   – Choi Kyu-hah, South Korean politician, 4th President of South Korea (d. 2006)
1920 – Anatole Broyard, American critic and editor (d. 1990)
1923 – Chris Argyris, American psychologist, theorist, and academic (d. 2013)
  1923   – Bola Sete, Brazilian guitarist (d. 1987)
1924 – James L. Greenfield, American journalist and politician
  1924   – Bess Myerson, American model, actress, game show panelist, and politician, Miss America 1945 (d. 2014)
  1924   – Rupert Deese, Northern Mariana Islander ceramic artist (d. 2010)
1925 – Frank Jobe, American sergeant and surgeon (d. 2014)
  1925   – Rosita Quintana, Argentine actress (d. 2021)
  1925   – Cal Tjader, American jazz musician (d. 1982)
1926 – Ivica Horvat, Croatian footballer and manager (d. 2012)
  1926   – Irwin Rose, American biologist and academic, Nobel Prize laureate (d. 2015)
1927 – Pierre F. Côté, Canadian lawyer and civil servant (d. 2013)
  1927   – Shirley Hughes, English author and illustrator (d. 2022)
  1927   – Derek Hawksworth, English footballer (d. 2021)
1928 – Anita Brookner, English novelist and art historian  (d. 2016)
  1928   – Bella Davidovich, Soviet-American pianist
  1928   – Robert Sheckley, American author and screenwriter (d. 2005)
  1928   – Jim Rathmann, American race car driver (d. 2011)
  1928   – Dave Treen, American lawyer and politician, 51st Governor of Louisiana (d. 2009)
  1928   – Andrzej Zawada, Polish mountaineer and author (d. 2000)
1929 – Charles Ray Hatcher, American serial killer (d. 1984)
  1929   – Sheri S. Tepper, American author and poet (d. 2016)
  1929   – Gaby Tanguy, French swimmer (d. 1981)
1930 – Guy Béart, Egyptian-French singer-songwriter (d. 2015)
  1930   – Michael Bilirakis, American lawyer and politician
  1930   – Bert Rechichar, American football defensive back and kicker (d. 2019)
1931 – Fergus Gordon Kerr, Scottish Roman Catholic priest of the English Dominican Province
  1931   – Norm Sherry, American baseball player, manager, and coach (d. 2021)
1932 – John Chilton, English trumpet player and composer (d. 2016)
  1932   – Max McGee, American football player and sportscaster (d. 2007)
  1932   – Dick Thornburgh, American lawyer and politician, 76th United States Attorney General (d. 2020)
1933 – Julian A. Brodsky, American businessman
  1934   – Denise LaSalle, American singer-songwriter and producer (d. 2018)
1934 – Tomás Eloy Martínez, Argentine journalist (d. 2010)
  1934   – Katherine D. Ortega, 38th Treasurer of the United States
  1934   – Donald M. Payne, American educator and politician (d. 2012)
1935 – Carl Epting Mundy Jr., American general (d. 2014)
  1935   – Lynn Wyatt, American socialite and philanthropist
1936 – Yasuo Fukuda, Japanese politician, 91st Prime Minister of Japan
  1936   – Buddy Merrill, American guitarist (d. 2021)
  1936   – Jerry Norman, American sinologist and linguist (d. 2012)
  1936   – Venkataraman Subramanya, Indian-Australian cricketer
1937 – Richard Bryan, American lawyer and politician, 25th Governor of Nevada
  1937   – John Daly, English director, producer, and screenwriter (d. 2008)
1938 – Cynthia Enloe, American author and academic
  1938   – Tony Jackson, English singer and bass player (d. 2003)
1939 – William Bell, American singer-songwriter
  1939   – Ali Khamenei, Iranian cleric and politician, 2nd Supreme Leader of Iran
  1939   – Lido Vieri, Italian football manager and football player
  1939   – Ruth Perry, president of Liberia (d. 2017)
  1939   – Shringar Nagaraj, Indian actor and producer (d. 2013)
  1939   – Corin Redgrave, English actor and activist (d. 2010)
  1939   – Mariele Ventre, Italian singer and conductor (d. 1995)
1941 – Desmond Dekker, Jamaican singer-songwriter (d. 2006)
  1941   – Dag Solstad, Norwegian author and playwright
  1941   – Hans Wiegel, Dutch journalist and politician, Deputy Prime Minister of the Netherlands
  1941   – Sir George Young, 6th Baronet, English banker and politician, Secretary of State for Transport
1942 – Margaret Court, Australian tennis player and minister
1943 – Reinaldo Arenas, Cuban-American author, poet, and playwright (d. 1990)
  1943   – Vernon Bogdanor, English political scientist and academic
  1943   – Jimmy Johnson, American football player and coach
1944 – Angharad Rees, English-Welsh actress and jewellery designer (d. 2012)
1946 – Louise Fréchette, Canadian civil servant and diplomat, Deputy Secretary-General of the United Nations
1947 – Don Burke, Australian television host and producer
  1947   – Alexis Herman, American businesswoman and politician, 23rd United States Secretary of Labor
  1947   – Assata Shakur, American-Cuban criminal and activist
1948 – Rubén Blades, Panamanian singer-songwriter, guitarist, and actor
  1948   – Lars Lagerbäck, Swedish footballer and manager
  1948   – Kevin McKenzie, South African cricketer
  1948   – Pinchas Zukerman, Israeli violinist and conductor
1950 – Pierre Paradis, Canadian lawyer and politician
  1950   – Dennis Priestley, English darts player
  1950   – Frances Spalding, English historian and academic
  1950   – Tom Terrell, American journalist and photographer (d. 2007)
1951 – Jean-Luc Mongrain, Canadian journalist
  1951   – Che Rosli, Malaysian politician
1952 – Stewart Copeland, American drummer and songwriter 
  1952   – Marc Esposito, French director and screenwriter
  1952   – Ken McEwan, South African cricketer
1953 – Douglas J. Feith, American lawyer and politician, Under Secretary of Defense for Policy
1955 – Susan Wheeler, American poet and academic
  1955   – Saw Swee Leong, Malaysian badminton player
1956 – Tony Kushner, American playwright and screenwriter
1957 – Faye Grant, American actress
  1957   – Alexandra Marinina, Ukrainian-Russian colonel and author
1958 – Mick Cornett, American politician
  1958   – Michael Flatley, American-Irish dancer and choreographer
1959 – Gary Anderson, South African-American football player
  1959   – James MacMillan, Scottish composer and conductor
  1959   – Jürgen Ligi, Estonian economist and politician, 25th Estonian Minister of Defence
1960 – Terry Pendleton, American baseball player and coach
1962 – Grigory Leps, Russian singer-songwriter
1963 – Phoebe Cates, American actress
  1963   – Srečko Katanec, Slovenian footballer and coach
  1963   – Mikael Pernfors, Swedish tennis player
1964 – Phil Hellmuth, American poker player
  1964   – Miguel Induráin, Spanish cyclist
1965 – Michel Desjoyeaux, French sailor
  1965   – Claude Lemieux, Canadian ice hockey player
1966 – Jyrki Lumme, Finnish ice hockey player
1967 – Will Ferrell, American actor, comedian, and producer
1968 – Dhanraj Pillay, Indian field hockey player and manager
  1968   – Barry Sanders, American football player
  1968   – Larry Sanger, American philosopher and businessman, co-founded Wikipedia and Citizendium
  1968   – Michael Searle, Australian rugby league player and businessman
  1968   – Robert Sherman, American songwriter and businessman
  1968   – Olga Souza, Brazilian singer and dancer
1969 – Kathryn Harby-Williams, Australian netball player and sportscaster
1970 – Raimonds Miglinieks, Latvian basketball player and coach
  1970   – Apichatpong Weerasethakul, Thai director, producer, and screenwriter
1971 – Corey Feldman, American actor 
  1971   – Ed Kowalczyk, American singer-songwriter and guitarist
1972 – Ben Cahoon, American-Canadian football player and coach
  1972   – François Drolet, Canadian speed skater
1973 – Shaun Pollock, South African cricketer
  1973   – Graham Robertson, American director and producer
  1973   – Tim Ryan, American politician
1974 – Maret Maripuu, Estonian politician, Estonian Minister of Social Affairs
  1974   – Wendell Sailor, Australian rugby player
1976 – Tomasz Kuchar, Polish racing driver
  1976   – Carlos Humberto Paredes, Paraguayan footballer
  1976   – Anna Smashnova, Belarusian-Israeli tennis player
1977 – Bryan Budd, Northern Ireland-born English soldier, Victoria Cross recipient (d. 2006)
1979 – Chris Mihm, American basketball player
  1979   – Kim Rhode, American sport shooter
  1979   – Nathan Rogers, Canadian singer-songwriter and guitarist
  1979   – Konstantin Skrylnikov, Russian footballer
1980 – Adam Scott, Australian golfer
1981 – Giuseppe Di Masi, Italian footballer
  1981   – Robert Kranjec, Slovenian ski jumper
  1981   – Zach Randolph, American basketball player
  1981   – Vicente Rodríguez, Spanish footballer
1982 – André Greipel, German cyclist
  1982   – Carli Lloyd, American soccer player
  1982   – Michael Umaña, Costa Rican footballer
1983 – Katrina Kaif, British Indian actress and model
  1983   – Duncan Keith, Canadian ice hockey player
1984 – Hayanari Shimoda, Japanese racing driver
  1984   – Attila Szabó, Hungarian decathlete
1985 – Mārtiņš Kravčenko, Latvian basketball player
1986 – Misako Uno, Japanese actress, singer, and fashion designer 
1987 – Mousa Dembélé, Belgian footballer
  1987   – AnnaLynne McCord, American actress and producer
  1987   – Knowshon Moreno, American football player
1988 – Sergio Busquets, Spanish footballer
1989 – Gareth Bale, Welsh footballer
1990 – Bureta Faraimo, New Zealand rugby league player
  1990   – Wizkid, Nigerian singer and songwriter
  1990   – Johann Zarco, French motorcycle racer
1991 – Dylan Grimes, Australian Rules footballer
1991 –Nate Schmidt, American ice hockey player
  1991 – Andros Townsend, English footballer
1996 – Daniel Pearson, English actor and presenter

Deaths

Pre-1600
 784 – Fulrad, Frankish diplomat and saint (b. 710)
 851 – Sisenandus, Cordoban deacon and martyr (b. c. 825)
 866 – Irmgard, Frankish abbess
1212 – William de Brus, 3rd Lord of Annandale
1216 – Pope Innocent III (b. 1160)
1324 – Emperor Go-Uda of Japan (b. 1267)
1342 – Charles I of Hungary (b. 1288)
1344 – An-Nasir Ahmad, Sultan of Egypt (b. 1316)
1509 – João da Nova, Portuguese explorer (b. 1460)
1546 – Anne Askew, English author and poet (b. 1520)
1557 – Anne of Cleves, Queen consort of England (b. 1515)
1576 – Isabella de' Medici, Italian noble (b. 1542)

1601–1900
1647 – Masaniello, Italian rebel (b. 1622)
1664 – Andreas Gryphius, German poet and playwright (b. 1616)
1686 – John Pearson, English bishop and scholar (b. 1612)
1691 – François-Michel le Tellier, Marquis de Louvois, French politician, French Secretary of State for War (b. 1641)
1729 – Johann David Heinichen, German composer and theorist (b. 1683)
1747 – Giuseppe Crespi, Italian painter (b. 1665)
1770 – Francis Cotes, English painter and academic (b. 1726)
1796 – George Howard, English field marshal and politician (b. 1718)
1831 – Louis Alexandre Andrault de Langeron, French-Russian general (b. 1763)
1849 – Sarah Allen, African-American missionary for the African Methodist Episcopal Church (b. 1764)
1868 – Dmitry Pisarev, Russian author and critic (b. 1840)
1879 – Edward Deas Thomson, Scottish-Australian politician, 3rd Chief Secretary of New South Wales (b. 1800)
1882 – Mary Todd Lincoln, First Lady of the United States 1861–1865 (b. 1818)
1885 – Rosalía de Castro, Spanish poet (b. 1837)
1886 – Ned Buntline, American journalist and author (b. 1823)
1896 – Edmond de Goncourt, French critic and publisher, founded Académie Goncourt (b. 1822)

1901–present
1915 – Ellen G. White, American theologian and author (b. 1827)
1917 – Philipp Scharwenka, German composer and educator (b. 1847)
1935 – Zheng Zhengqiu, Chinese filmmaker (b. 1889)
1939 – Bartholomeus Roodenburch, Dutch swimmer (b. 1866)
1943 – Saul Raphael Landau, Polish Jewish lawyer, journalist, publicist and Zionist activist (b. 1870)
1949 – Vyacheslav Ivanov, Russian poet and playwright (b. 1866)
1953 – Hilaire Belloc, French-born British writer and historian (b. 1870)
1954 – Herms Niel, German soldier, trombonist, and composer (b. 1888)
1960 – Albert Kesselring, German field marshal (b. 1881)
  1960   – John P. Marquand, American author (b. 1893)
1964 – Rauf Orbay, Turkish colonel and politician, Prime Minister of Turkey (b. 1881)
1965 – Boris Artzybasheff, Ukrainian-American illustrator (b.1899)
1969 – James Scott Douglas, English-born Scottish race car driver and 6th Baronet Douglas (b. 1930)
1981 – Harry Chapin, American singer-songwriter and guitarist (b. 1942)
1982 – Charles Robberts Swart, South African lawyer and politician, 1st State President of South Africa (b. 1894)
1985 – Heinrich Böll, German novelist and short story writer, Nobel Prize laureate (b. 1917)
  1985   – Wayne King, American saxophonist, songwriter, and bandleader (b. 1901)
1989 – Herbert von Karajan, Austrian conductor and manager (b. 1908)
1990 – Robert Blackburn, Irish educator (b. 1927)
  1990   – Miguel Muñoz, Spanish footballer and manager (b. 1922)
1991 – Meindert DeJong, Dutch-American soldier and author (b. 1906)
  1991   – Robert Motherwell, American painter and academic (b. 1915)
  1991   – Frank Rizzo, American police officer and politician, 93rd Mayor of Philadelphia (b. 1920)
1992 – Buck Buchanan, American football player and coach (b. 1940)
1994 – Julian Schwinger, American physicist and academic, Nobel Prize laureate (b. 1918)
1995 – May Sarton, American playwright and novelist (b. 1912)
  1995   – Stephen Spender, English author and poet (b. 1909)
1996 – Adolf von Thadden, German lieutenant and politician (b. 1921)
1998 – John Henrik Clarke, American historian and scholar (b. 1915)
1999 – John F. Kennedy Jr., American lawyer and publisher (b. 1960)
  1999   – Alan Macnaughton, Canadian lawyer and politician, Speaker of the Canadian House of Commons (b. 1903)
2001 – Morris, Belgian cartoonist (b. 1923)
2002 – John Cocke, American computer scientist and engineer (b. 1925)
2003 – Celia Cruz, Cuban-American singer and actress (b. 1925)
  2003   – Carol Shields, American-Canadian novelist and short story writer (b. 1935)
2004 – George Busbee, American lawyer and politician, 77th Governor of Georgia (b. 1927)
  2004   – Charles Sweeney, American general and pilot (b. 1919)
2005 – Pietro Consagra, Italian sculptor (b. 1920)
  2005   – Camillo Felgen, Luxembourgian singer-songwriter and radio host (b. 1920)
2006 – Winthrop Paul Rockefeller, American businessman and politician, 13th Lieutenant Governor of Arkansas (b. 1948)
2007 – Caterina Bueno, Italian singer and historian (b. 1943)
2008 – Jo Stafford, American singer (b. 1917)
  2008   – Lindsay Thompson, Australian politician, 40th Premier of Victoria (b. 1923)
2011 – Forrest Blue, American football player (b. 1944)
2012 – William Asher, American director, producer, and screenwriter (b. 1921)
  2012   – Stephen Covey, American businessman and author (b. 1932)
  2012   – Gilbert Esau, American businessman and politician (b. 1919)
  2012   – Ed Lincoln, Brazilian bassist, pianist, and composer (b. 1932)
  2012   – Masaharu Matsushita, Japanese businessman (b. 1913)
  2012   – Kitty Wells, American singer-songwriter and guitarist (b. 1919)
2013 – Talia Castellano, American internet celebrity (b. 1999)
  2013   – Alex Colville, Canadian painter and academic (b. 1920)
  2013   – Marv Rotblatt, American baseball player (1927)
2014 – Karl Albrecht, German businessman, co-founded Aldi (b. 1920)
  2014   – Mary Ellen Otremba, American educator and politician (b. 1950)
  2014   – Johnny Winter, American singer-songwriter, guitarist, and producer (b. 1944)
  2014   – Heinz Zemanek, Austrian computer scientist and academic (b. 1920)
2015 – Denis Avey, English soldier, engineer, and author (b. 1919)
  2015   – Evelyn Ebsworth, English chemist and academic (b. 1933)
  2015   – Alcides Ghiggia, Uruguayan footballer and manager (b. 1926)
  2015   – Jack Goody, English anthropologist, author, and academic (b. 1919)
2017 – George Romero, American filmmaker (b. 1940)
2019 – John Paul Stevens, American lawyer and jurist, Associate Justice of the Supreme Court of the United States (b. 1920)
2020 – Tony Taylor, Cuban baseball player (b. 1935)
2021 – Biz Markie, American rapper (b. 1964)

Holidays and observances
 Christian feast day:
 Gondulphus of Tongeren
 Helier
 Our Lady of Mount Carmel
Fiesta de La Tirana (Tarapacá Region, Chile) 
 Reineldis
 July 16 (Eastern Orthodox liturgics)
Engineer's Day (Honduras)
Holocaust Memorial Day (France)
Guinea Pig Appreciation Day

References

External links

 
 
 

Days of the year
July